Iota Sagittarii (Iota Sgr, ι Sagittarii, ι Sgr) is a star in the zodiac constellation of Sagittarius. With an apparent visual magnitude of +4.118, it is bright enough to be viewed with the naked eye. Based upon an annual parallax shift of 17.94 mas as seen from Earth, this star is located 182 light years from the Sun. It is moving away from the Earth with a radial velocity of +35.8 km/s.

This is a probable astrometric binary, based upon proper motion data collected during the Hipparcos mission. The visible component shows the spectrum of an evolved K-type giant or bright giant star with a stellar classification of K0 II-III. At an estimated distance of this star, this yields a physical size of about 14 times the radius of the Sun. It has 1.4 times the mass of the Sun and is radiating 87 times the Sun's luminosity from its photosphere at an effective temperature of about 4,594 K.

References

K-type giants
Sagittarii, Iota
Sagittarius (constellation)
PD-42 08944
188114
98032
7581
Astrometric binaries